Madigan is a 1968 American neo-noir crime drama thriller film directed by Don Siegel (as Donald Siegel) and starring Richard Widmark, Henry Fonda and Inger Stevens

The screenplay—originally titled Friday, Saturday, Sunday—was adapted by two writers who had been blacklisted in the 1950s, Howard Rodman (credited here under the pseudonym Henri Simoun) and Abraham Polonsky. It was based on the 1962 novel The Commissioner by Richard Dougherty, a former New York bureau chief of the Los Angeles Times who had served in the 1950s as a deputy New York City police commissioner for community relations.

Siegel was a genre director known at the time for taut action films like The Lineup (1958) and Hell Is for Heroes (1962), as well as the original Invasion of the Body Snatchers (1956). He later directed five films starring Clint Eastwood, including Dirty Harry.

Plot
In New York City's Spanish Harlem, police detectives Dan Madigan and Rocco Bonaro break into a sleazy apartment and arrest Barney Benesch, a hoodlum wanted for questioning by a Brooklyn precinct. Momentarily distracted by the suspect's nude girlfriend, the two detectives are outwitted by Benesch, who escapes with their guns.

When it is discovered that Benesch was wanted for homicide, Madigan and Bonaro are reprimanded by Police Commissioner Anthony X. Russell. Aside from this new problem, Russell is troubled by other matters: his married mistress, Tricia Bentley, has decided to end their relationship; a black minister, Dr. Taylor, is claiming that his teenaged son was subjected to brutality by racist policemen; and proof has been established that Russell's longtime friend and associate, Chief Inspector Kane, has accepted a bribe to protect a hangout for prostitutes.

Irritated by the fact that Madigan and Bonaro broke the rules by working for another precinct, Russell gives the two men 72 hours to arrest Benesch. Despite the deadline, Madigan tries to spend some time with his wife, Julia, who is socially and sexually frustrated as a result of her husband's dangerous and time-consuming job, though unknown to her he has a girl on the side, Jonesy, a nightclub singer. (Though she's sexually frustrated as well, and Madigan tells her he only loves Julia.)

The commissioner confronts Kane with the bribe evidence. The inspector was trying to help his son out of a jam. He offers to turn in his badge but resents Russell's outrage at how he could have done such a thing, asking the commissioner what he would know about being a father.

Madigan takes Julia to a fancy dress ball for the department, which includes getting to stay at the Sherry-Netherland Hotel.  She's excited and happy until she realizes he's going to ditch her early on and go back to work.  Knowing Julia was looking forward to dancing, he leaves her in the hands of Captain Ben Williams, who uses the opportunity to get her drunk and seduce her—he nearly succeeds, but she can't go through with it.

Benesch shoots two policemen with Madigan's gun. The detectives finally get a lead through bookie Midget Castiglione, who puts them in touch with Hughie, one of Benesch's pimps. Tracing the fugitive to a Spanish Harlem apartment, Madigan and Bonaro bring in a police cordon and order the killer to surrender. When he refuses, the two detectives rush the building and break down the door. In the exchange of gunfire, Madigan is fatally wounded before Bonaro can kill Benesch.

Russell tries to comfort Julia, but she accuses him of being a heartless administrator. As the commissioner leaves with Chief Inspector Kane, he is asked about Dr. Taylor's situation and other pressing matters at hand. Russell tells him that these are things they can address tomorrow.

Cast
 Richard Widmark as Det. Daniel Madigan
 Henry Fonda as Commissioner Anthony X. Russell
 Inger Stevens as Julia Madigan
 Harry Guardino as Det. Rocco Bonaro
 James Whitmore as Chief Insp. Charles Kane
 Susan Clark as Tricia Bentley
 Michael Dunn as Midget Castiglione
 Steve Ihnat as Barney Benesch
 Don Stroud as Hughie
 Sheree North as Jonesy
 Warren Stevens as Ben Williams
 Raymond St. Jacques as Dr. Taylor
 Bert Freed as Chief of Detectives Hap Lynch
 Harry Bellaver as Mickey Dunn
 Frank Marth as Lt. James Price
 Lloyd Gough as Ass. Chief Inspector Earl Griffin 
 Virginia Gregg as Esther Newman
 Henry Beckman as Ptl. Philip Downes
 Woodrow Parfrey as Marvin
 Dallas Mitchell as Det. Tom Gavin
 Lloyd Haynes as Ptl. Sam Woodley (as Lloyd Haines)
 Ray Montgomery as Det. O'Mara
 Seth Allen as Subway Dispatcher
 Kay Turner as Stella

Critical response
Reviews for Madigan were among the best of any film Siegel had directed. Critics praised its urban grittiness and straightforward style, and audiences responded to its excitement and tautness. Siegel would go on to direct other successful cop movies, including Coogan's Bluff (1968) and Dirty Harry (1971).

Collaborative clash
Serious clashes between Siegel and producer Frank Rosenberg marred the production. Rosenberg was a studio veteran who considered himself the boss of the project; as far as Siegel was concerned, once the cameras rolled, Siegel was boss. The very first day of the shooting schedule set by Rosenberg, for example, called for a highly emotional and poignant scene that comes at the end of the film, in which actress Inger Stevens berates Henry Fonda for the death of her husband. To make things more difficult for Stevens' concentration, she was also scheduled to shoot wardrobe tests throughout the day. Stevens approached Siegel almost in tears. The director apologized, suggesting, "When you're playing this painful scene with Mr. Fonda, think of the loathing you feel for Frank Rosenberg, who is responsible for this ridiculous schedule." In the end, Siegel wrote, "Miss Stevens gave a startling portrayal, truly magnificent and brave."
Rosenberg also reportedly interfered in tiny, annoying ways, as in the shooting of Henry Fonda's first scene. The actor walked into a room where Susan Clark was lying on a bed and said, "You can open the other eye now, I made coffee." Siegel said, "Print it," but Rosenberg, who had been watching, demanded that it be reshot because Fonda didn't say "the" coffee. "It changes the whole meaning," Rosenberg insisted. When an angry Siegel refused to reshoot it, Rosenberg later had Fonda record the "the" and looped it into the final cut.
The most significant clash came over the location for the action-packed ending. Most of the picture had been shot on location in New York, but for the finale the company moved to Los Angeles. New York was getting to be too dangerous: Widmark and Guardino's car had been attacked by a gang in Harlem, and the prop man had been mugged. Rosenberg picked a location in L.A. that Siegel found to be unimaginative and virtually unusable. Siegel himself then discovered a location that was perfect and looked very much like New York, but Rosenberg still insisted that his choice be used. Siegel went over Rosenberg's head to Lew Wasserman, the head of Universal. He made his case, showed photos of both locations, and Wasserman agreed that Siegel's choice was best.
Henry Fonda echoed these accounts of Rosenberg. Attracted to the project because his part as the police commissioner was so three-dimensional, he found that Rosenberg toned down much of the character's depth in the screenplay. "He just wouldn't listen to anything," Fonda said. "He fancied himself a writer and rewrote scenes which we'd try to change on the set, but eventually he'd make us dub it the way he had written it, putting single words back in. The rest of us on the set got along beautifully. It was still a good picture because of what Don did with it."
"Don's tough," said Richard Widmark. "He could have slid over the ending we wanted. He could have said, 'Let's shoot it and get it over with.' It was the end of the picture and we were all tired. But no sir. He fought like a bastard. A director can't operate on the idea that everyone has to like him. If he does, somewhere along the line reality is going to hit." Widmark called Siegel one of the three best directors he ever worked with, along with John Ford and Elia Kazan. "He's efficient, organized, quiet, and in total command. You never feel any loose ends. And he has taste."

Television series
In 1972, Widmark reprised the title role (literally bringing the character back from the dead) for the NBC television series Madigan. That show ran as part of the NBC Wednesday Mystery Movie series, sharing its timeslot with several other programs. It lasted only a single season, producing six episodes.

See also
 List of American films of 1968

References

External links
 
 
 
 
 

1968 films
1960s crime thriller films
American crime thriller films
Fictional portrayals of the New York City Police Department
Films based on American novels
Films directed by Don Siegel
Films scored by Don Costa
Films set in New York City
Films shot in New York City
Films about the New York City Police Department
American police detective films
Universal Pictures films
American neo-noir films
1960s English-language films
1960s American films